March for Science 2018 was a protest across the United States and internationally. It was planned to be like the March for Science 2017, being the second annual March for Science.

Events

The protests arose in response to the withdrawal from The Paris Climate Change Agreement, changes in sexual health education programs for teenagers, and actions to prevent researchers from publicly communicating their research. The protesters also responded to controversial cabinet appointments by the Trump administration, citing that positions requiring advanced scientific knowledge are being filled by appointees without proper experience in their field.

The 2018 March for Science organizers wrote a statement about themselves and what they stand for, reading, " We are people who value science and recognize how science serves. We come from all races, all religions, all gender identities, all sexual orientations, all abilities, all socioeconomic backgrounds, all political perspectives, and all nationalities. Our diversity is our greatest strength: a wealth of opinions, perspectives, and ideas is critical for the scientific process. What unites us is a love of science, and an insatiable curiosity. We all recognize that science is everywhere and affects everyone."

Activities

United States

Cities with events include:

 Albany, New York 
 Atlanta
 Boston
 Buffalo, New York
 Charlottesville, Virginia
 Chicago
 Chico, California
 Cleveland
 Fullerton, California
 Iowa City, Iowa
 Nashville
 New York City
 Orlando, Florida
 Rochester, New York
 Saint Paul, Minnesota
 San Antonio, Texas
 Santa Barbara, California
 Trenton, New Jersey
Washington, D.C.
 White Salmon, Washington

Outside the United States

 Australia
 Germany: Braunschweig, Bremen, Coblenz, Dresden, Frankfurt, Göttingen, Kassel, Kiel, Munich, Münster, Neuruppin, Cologne, Saarbrücken, Stuttgart, Trier
 India
 United Kingdom: London
 Canada: Toronto
 Ukraine:  Kyiv (about 300 people took part in a March for Science on 14 April 2018)

Partners
Groups that have partnered or backed the march include the American Association for the Advancement of Science, The Nature Conservancy, the National Science Teachers Association, the American Geophysical Union, and the American Association of Anatomists.

See also
 List of 2017 March for Science locations
 March for Science
 March for Science Portland

References

External links 
 

2018 in American politics
2018 in science
2018 in the environment
2018 protests
April 2018 events in the United States
Protest marches
Protests in the United States
April 2018 events in India
Protests in India